Azul Azul was a pop-rock-dance group formed in Santa Cruz de la Sierra, Bolivia in early 1990s. Azul Azul had their major breakthrough in 1995 with a song called El Huevo (Spanish for "The Egg"). Azul Azul launched albums the following years 1995, 1999, 2003 and 2006.

Azul Azul's second breakthrough in Latin America came with the hit song "La Bomba", which was later covered by King Africa. King Africa's cover became a massive hit in Spain and many other European countries. The Azul Azul album "El Sapo" has sold about 300,000 copies worldwide according to Sony Latin America.

References

Bolivian musical groups
Latin pop music groups